Marja Liisa Autti (née Portin; born January 5, 1966) is a Finnish orienteering competitor. She received a bronze medal in the relay event at the 1989 World Orienteering Championships in Skövde, together with Ulla Mänttäri, Annika Viilo and Eija Koskivaara.

Marja Liisa Portin participated in three WOC events. In WOC Bendigo, Australia 1985 she placed 22nd in Individual event and a sixth place in relay event with Riitta Karjalainen, Ulla Mänttäri and Annariitta Kottonen. In WOC Sweden 1989 she placed 13th in the individual event. In Karlovy Vary 1991 she took 8th place in short distance, 11th in Classic Distance and 5th place in relay event together with Mari Lukkarinen, Kirsi Tiira and Eija Koskivaara.

Marja Liisa also has a long history in Nordic Orienteering Championships (NOM). She debuted in 1984 in Balsfjord, Norway, where she placed 5th in damer junior class and received a bronze medal in damer junior relay event together with Annika Heino, Ulla Mänttäri and Tiina Äijälä. in 1986 Saltvik, Åland she placed 6th in damer junior class. 1990 in Fanø, Denmark she took 8th place in senior class. 1992 in Rena, Norway she received a bronze medal in damer senior relay event together with Kirsi Tiira, Annika Viilo and Eija Koskivaara. 1993 in Sibbo, Finland she placed 9th in classic distance and 5th in short distance, as well as received Nordic championship gold medal in relay event together with Marja Pyymäki, Kirsi Tiira and Eija Koskivaara.

Marja Liisa received a Master of Science degree in Electronic Engineering from Helsinki University of Technology in 1991, and works as a Patent Attorney at Boco IP.

See also
 List of orienteers
 List of orienteering events

References

1966 births
Living people
Finnish orienteers
Female orienteers
Foot orienteers
World Orienteering Championships medalists